Uxbridge was a seat returning one Member of Parliament (MP) of the House of Commons of the UK Parliament from 1885 to 2010.  Its MPs elected were: Conservative Party candidates for 107 years and Labour Party candidates for 18 years. The closing 40 years of the seat's history saw Conservative victory — in 1997 on a very marginal majority in relative terms.

The seat began with the market towns Uxbridge and Staines shedding the latter and its southern half in 1918; by 1945 more new seats were needed. Its eastern area merited Southall and the loss of Northolt to Ealing West (all new seats) and in 1950 of Ruislip, Northwood and Harefield to become Ruislip-Northwood and of Hayes and Harlington, taking up eastern territory and some of that lost in 1918.  In each possible boundary reform the seat was reduced reflecting population expansion of areas outlying its core area of Uxbridge and interwoven Hillingdon, Cowley and Ickenham.

Boundaries

1885–1918: The parliamentary constituency of Uxbridge was created as the westernmost county division of the county of Middlesex. The Redistribution of Seats Act 1885 defined the seat as comprising the parishes of Ashford*, Bedfont, Cowley, Cranford, Feltham, Hampton, Hampton Wick, Hanworth, Harefield, Harlington, Harmondsworth, Hayes, Hillingdon East, Hillingdon West, Ickenham, Laleham*, Littleton*, Northolt, Ruislip, Shepperton*, Staines*, Stanwell*, Sunbury*, Teddington, Uxbridge, West Drayton, and Yiewsley.  The shape of the seat was irregular and it stretched more than three times the maximum length than its final form and twice its breadth.

The parishes (as various successor urban districts) marked * were absorbed into Surrey and the others absorbed into Greater London, in 1965.

 

1918–1945: Uxbridge was cut down to be a north-western division of Middlesex. Large areas to the south were removed to form Spelthorne (UK Parliament constituency).

The local government areas in the new Uxbridge seat were defined, by the Representation of the People Act 1918, as the urban districts of Hayes, Ruislip-Northwood, Southall-Norwood, Uxbridge, and Yiewsley as well as the Uxbridge Rural District.

1945–1950: included in 1945's interim redistribution of seats with more than 100,000 registered electors. Reduced to the urban districts of Ruislip-Northwood and Uxbridge. This saw contributions to two new seats: Southall, almost its whole; Ealing West, (as to Northolt); a cast-off for five years to Spelthorne of southerly Yiewsley and West Drayton Urban District.

1950–1974: Under 1950 redistribution, Ruislip-Northwood became a new seat in the north and north-east. Uxbridge with immediate neighbours north south and east (together forming the Municipal Borough of Uxbridge in 1955) was re-united with Yiewsley and West Drayton, to form the last incarnation of the county division.

In 1965 saw the last major Local Government reform. Area covered became part of the London Borough of Hillingdon.

1974–1983: The seat was re-classified as a borough constituency.  Its wards were for approximately an identical area as before: Colham-Cowley, Harefield, Hillingdon East, Hillingdon West, Ickenham, Uxbridge, and Yiewsley.

1983–1997: ward names in local government, not coverage, changed to: Colham, Cowley, Harefield, Hillingdon East, Hillingdon North, Hillingdon West, Ickenham, Uxbridge North, Uxbridge South, West Drayton, and Yiewsley.

1997–2010: Harefield ward was lost to Ruislip-Northwood, list/extent above (1983-1997) otherwise unchanged.

Boundary review
Following their review of parliamentary representation in North London, the Boundary Commission for England created a new constituency of Uxbridge and South Ruislip.

A number of electoral wards in Hillingdon were moved into the new constituency of Ruislip, Northwood and Pinner

Members of Parliament

Election results

Elections in the 1880s

Elections in the 1890s

Elections in the 1900s

Elections in the 1910s 

endorsed by Coalition Government

Elections in the 1920s

Elections in the 1930s

Election in the 1940s

Elections in the 1950s

Elections in the 1960s

Elections in the 1970s

Elections in the 1980s

Elections in the 1990s

Elections in the 2000s

See also
List of parliamentary constituencies in London

References

Politics of the London Borough of Hillingdon
Constituencies of the Parliament of the United Kingdom established in 1885
Constituencies of the Parliament of the United Kingdom disestablished in 2010
Parliamentary constituencies in London (historic)
Uxbridge